William Telfer (21 March 1909 – 15 May 1986) was a Scottish footballer who played as a left half for Blantyre Celtic, Motherwell, Airdrieonians (wartime guest), Dumbarton (wartime guest) and Scotland. He was a member of the Motherwell team that won the club's only Scottish Football League title in 1931–32, missing only one match in that season, and also played in two Scottish Cup finals (1931 and 1939, defeats to Celtic and Clyde respectively).

Both of his international caps came against Ireland; the second resulted in a loss in Glasgow, and Telfer was one of five in the Scotland team who were not selected again.

References

Sources

External links

London Hearts profile (Scotland)
London Hearts profile (Scottish League)

1909 births
1986 deaths
Scottish footballers
Sportspeople from Shotts
Footballers from North Lanarkshire
Association football wing halves
Scotland international footballers
Scottish Junior Football Association players
Blantyre Celtic F.C. players
Motherwell F.C. players
Scottish Football League players
Scottish Football League representative players
Airdrieonians F.C. (1878) wartime guest players
Dumbarton F.C. wartime guest players